Parliamentary elections were held in Greece on . They were boycotted by Eleftherios Venizelos and his party, the Liberal Party, as unconstitutional, a result of a confrontation with King Constantine I over the country's participation in World War I. Venizelos considered Greece as a close and loyal ally of the United Kingdom and France, while Constantine I, who was affiliated with the House of Hohenzollern (the German royal family), favored neutrality.

Although the electoral body supported Venizelos, Constantine insisted on his position and did not hesitate to confront the democratically elected government. Venizelos resigned and withdrew temporarily from the political fore, leading the crisis to its worst point.

Only right-wing parties participated in the elections. In a few months the crisis would almost become a civil war (the "National Schism") between the supporters of Venizelos, who created their own government in Thessaloniki, while the official government of Athens remained under the control of Constantine.

Results

References

1915 12
Greece
1915 in Greece
1910s in Greek politics
Eleftherios Venizelos
History of Greece (1909–1924)
Greece
Legl